Kamilo Dočkal (30 December 1879 – 7 August 1963) was a Croatian church and art historian, cultural worker and a violinist.

Life 

Dočkal was born in Brodek u Přerova in present-day Czech Republic. As a five-year-old he moved with his parent to Ivanovčani near Bjelovar. He finished gymnasium and theology studies in Zagreb. In 1902 he became a Catholic priest. He continued to study philosophy and theology in Vienna at the Higher Scientific Institute for Diocesan Priests at St. Augustine's, earning a Ph.D. in theology in 1906.

He worked as a catechist in real gymnasium in Zagreb between 1906 and 1914. Later he served as a secretary to Archbishop Anton Bauer and a master of sciences at the Theology Seminary between 1914 and 1920. In 1920 he became a rector of the same seminary, serving until 1935. At the Faculty of Theology in Zagreb he taught Church history between 1915 and 1919 and then pastoral theology, homiletics and catechetics between 1919 and 1921.

In 1920, Dočkal became a canon. He participated in the Union of the Catholic Clergy and its congresses in Velehrad. He wrote several books and discussions where he enlightens the efforts and work results on Christian unity. Dočkal also collected paintings, statues and Church clothes on the territory of the Archdiocese of Zagreb. Of the collected arts, he made an independent collection and founded the Diocesan Museum in 1939, becoming its first director at the same time. For more than a decade, Dočkal researched the history of Paulines in Croatia. He collected Material for the history of the Pauline monasteries in Croatia (a manuscript kept in the Archives of the Croatian Academy of Sciences and Arts). He also researched the history of Croatian institutes in Bologna (Collegium hungarico-illyricum an. 1553. Bononiae fundatum) and Vienna (Collegium Croaticum Viennae an. 1627. fundatum). Dočkal also wrote for several journals: Katolički list, Mladost, Ćirilometodski vjesnik, Bogoslovska smotra, and Život.

Dočkal was also a musician, a violinist. He was a member of the Social Orchestra of the Croatian Music Institute, and as of 1929, a member of its directorate. He was also a chamber musician. He served as a president of the Croatian Catholic Casino, where he founded a string orchestra. Dočkal wrote musical reviews for journals Hrvatska, Novine, Hrvatska straža, and Sveta Cecilija.

Published works

Church history

Music

Footnotes

References

Websites 

 
 

1879 births
1963 deaths
20th-century Croatian historians
Croatian composers
Croatian theologians
Croatian people of Czech descent